James Hamilton is a former American football linebacker who played for the Jacksonville Jaguars. He was often injured and did not record a single start in his two-year NFL career and only played in 16 games over the two seasons.

References

1974 births
Living people
American football linebackers
North Carolina Tar Heels football players
Jacksonville Jaguars players